A Game Engine (game environment) is a specialized development environment for creating video games. The features one provides depends on the type and the granularity of control allowed by the underlying framework. Some may provide diagrams, a windowing environment and debugging facilities. Users build the game with the game IDE, which may incorporate a game engine or call it externally. Game IDEs are typically specialized and tailored to work with one specific game engine.

This is not to be confused with game environment art, which is "the setting or location in which [a] game takes place." This is also in distinction from domain-specific entertainment languages, where all is needed is a text editor. They are distinct from integrated development environments which are more general, and may provide different sets of features.

There is also a distinction from Visual programming language in that programming languages are more general than Game Engines.

Examples
Below are some game engines and frameworks which come with specialized IDEs.

Adventure Game Studio
Blender Game Engine (discontinued)
Construct
CryEngine
Game Core
Game Editor
Game Maker
Gamut from CMU (not Stanford)
Gamestudio
GDevelop
Godot
Goji Editor
Magic Work Station
PlayCanvas
RPG Maker
SdlBasic
SharpLudus
The 3D Gamemaker
Unity
Unreal Engine
Virtual Play Table
VASSAL

References

 
Integrated development environments
Video game development